The 1955 Tulsa Golden Hurricane football team represented the University of Tulsa during the 1955 college football season. In their first year under head coach Bobby Dobbs, the Golden Hurricane compiled a 2–7–1 record, 1–3 against Missouri Valley Conference opponents, and finished in a tie for last place in the conference.

Schedule

References

Tulsa
Tulsa Golden Hurricane football seasons
Tulsa Golden Hurricane football